is a former Japanese football player and manager.

Playing career
Arima was born in Yokohama on November 26, 1972. After graduating from Nihon University, he joined Kashiwa Reysol in 1995 which had been newly promoted to the J1 League. He mainly played as a substitute for 3 seasons. In 1998, he moved to Consadole Sapporo, and in 1999, to Yokohama FC, a new club in the Japan Football League based in Arima's home city. He was a regular player and the club were the league champions for 2 years in a row (1999-2000) and were promoted to the J2 League in 2001. Arima also became the top scorer and was presented the MVP award in 2000. He retired at the end of the 2002 season.

Coaching career
After retirement, Arima started coaching career at FC Tokyo in 2003. He mainly coached youth team until 2013. In 2014, he moved to newly was promoted to J3 League club, YSCC Yokohama and became a manager. Although he managed the club in 2 seasons, the club was at the bottom place for 2 years in a row and he resigned end of 2015 season. In 2019, he signed with J2 League club Fagiano Okayama.

Club statistics

Managerial statistics
Update; December 31, 2018

References

External links
 
 

1972 births
Living people
Nihon University alumni
Association football people from Kanagawa Prefecture
Japanese footballers
J1 League players
J2 League players
Japan Football League players
Kashiwa Reysol players
Hokkaido Consadole Sapporo players
Yokohama FC players
Japanese football managers
J2 League managers
J3 League managers
YSCC Yokohama managers
Fagiano Okayama managers
Association football forwards